Waldemar Robert Niestroj (born 2 December 1976) is a German former professional footballer who played as a midfielder for a number of clubs in Germany, England, Greece and Iceland.

Career
Niestroj was born in Opole, Silesia, Poland. He began his professional career with Fortuna Düsseldorf, making his debut on 26 April 1997 in a 5–0 loss at Bayern Munich, the only Bundesliga appearance of his career. He broke into the team during the 1997–98 season, scoring seven times, the best seasonal tally of his career.

After a bright start to the following campaign, he was spotted by English First Division side Wolverhampton Wanderers, who bought him in November 1998 for £500,000 as Colin Lee's first signing. He failed to make much impact though and managed just seven appearances in total (six of which came during the 1998–99 season that saw the club miss out on the play-offs on the final day).

Out of favour at Molineux, he spent the rest of his contract on loan at 1. FC Nürnberg and Greek side Iraklis Salonica. He then rejoined his former club Fortuna Düsseldorf as a free agent in January 2002, where he remained for a season-and-a-half.

He had short stays at FC Sachsen Leipzig, Icelandic side Grindavik, Preußen Münster and Greeks Panserraikos.

References

1976 births
Living people
People from Opole
Polish emigrants to Germany
Naturalized citizens of Germany
German people of Polish descent
German footballers
Association football midfielders
Bundesliga players
2. Bundesliga players
English Football League players
Fortuna Düsseldorf players
SC Preußen Münster players
1. FC Nürnberg players
Wolverhampton Wanderers F.C. players
Iraklis Thessaloniki F.C. players
Panserraikos F.C. players
FC Sachsen Leipzig players
Grindavík men's football players
SV 19 Straelen players
German expatriate footballers
German expatriate sportspeople in England
Expatriate footballers in England
German expatriate sportspeople in Greece
Expatriate footballers in Greece
German expatriate sportspeople in Iceland
Expatriate footballers in Iceland